The Anglican Church of St Mary in Chesterblade, Somerset, England was built in the 12th century. It is a Grade II* listed building. It is located 3 miles northeast of Evercreech (to which parish it belongs), and three miles south east of Shepton Mallet.

History

The church was first built in the 12th century and revised in the 13th and 15th centuries, with Victorian restoration in 1888. The church was linked with St John's Priory, Wells.

The parish of Evercreech with Chesterblade is part of the Alham Vale benefice within the Diocese of Bath and Wells.

Architecture

The church consists of a three-bay nave with a south porch and a chancel. Above the nave is a small bellcote. It has a king post roof.

The chancel includes some Jacobean panelling. The stone pulpit is 15th century, but the font is Norman. The font stands on Victorian encaustic tiles with an octagonal plinth.

References

Grade II* listed buildings in Mendip District
Grade II* listed churches in Somerset
Church of England church buildings in Mendip District